Nylshoogte Pass, Is situated in the Mpumalanga province, on the Regional road R38 (Mpumalanga), road between Nelspruit and Carolina (South Africa).

Mountain passes of Mpumalanga